Hemsbach is a small river of Bavaria, Germany. It is a left tributary of the Kahl.

See also 
List of rivers of Bavaria

References 

Rivers of Bavaria
Rivers of the Spessart
Rivers of Germany